Nyambaria High School is a secondary school located in Nyamira County, Kenya. It is a Seventh-day Adventist school that was established in 1966 as a small school, with few dormitories, but has grown considerably since then. Nyambaria School now has a student population of 2200.
It is part of the Seventh-day Adventist Church's worldwide educational system.

Campus
Presently, the school has twenty one classrooms, three laboratories, a computer lab, a capacity library, a woodwork shop, 14 dormitories and much else besides. It is located in a hilly neighbourhood nicknamed "London" for its affluence.

Among the school's athletic facilities are: football, handball, rugby,  and volleyball pitches, basketball and tennis courts.  The school has an active record in co-curricular activities having reached the nationals levels in drama, rugby, music, science congress and indoor games. The students are also involved in contests, symposia, discussions and excursions.

Since the inception of the school, it has been served by the following principals:

 Charles Mokaya (1966–1969)
 Daniel Mosomi (1970–1973)
 Musa Mokano (1974–1989)
 Lazarus Mainye (1990–2003)
 Robinson Otwori (2004–2016)
Gerald Orina  (2016-2018)
Boaz Owino  (2018–2022)

Spiritual aspects
All students take religion classes each year that they are enrolled. These classes cover topics in biblical history and Christian and denominational doctrines. Instructors in other disciplines also begin each class period with prayer or a short devotional thought, many which encourage student input. Weekly, the entire student body gathers together for an hour-long chapel service.
Outside the classrooms there is year-round spiritually oriented programming that relies on student involvement.

Athletics
The school offer the following  sports:
Soccer (boys )
Tennis
badminton
basketball
volleyball

See also

 List of Seventh-day Adventist secondary and elementary schools
 Seventh-day Adventist education
 Seventh-day Adventist Church
 Seventh-day Adventist theology
 History of the Seventh-day Adventist Church
List of Seventh-day Adventist secondary schools

External links
 

Educational institutions established in 1966
Education in Nyanza Province
Secondary schools affiliated with the Seventh-day Adventist Church
1966 establishments in Kenya
Nyamira County